Northeast Dubois High School is a high school in Dubois, Indiana.

Athletics
Its athletic nickname is the "Jeeps", which is named after Eugene the Jeep, a character in the Popeye comic strip. Northeast Dubois High School participates in the Blue Chip Conference and the school is known for their athletics programs, which include in the past four years: 13 sectionals, five regionals, one semi-state, and one state appearance.

See also
 List of high schools in Indiana

References

External links
 
 IHSAA

High schools in Southwestern Indiana
Public high schools in Indiana
Blue Chip Conference
Schools in Dubois County, Indiana